Fairhope may refer to:
Fairhope, Alabama
Fairhope High School, a public high school 
Fairhope Township, Somerset County, Pennsylvania
Fairhope, Pennsylvania, an unincorporated community in Somerset County
Fairhope Plantation, a historic plantation house near Uniontown, Alabama